Safe as Fuck is the second studio album by Goldie Lookin Chain, released in 2005. The first single from it was "Your Missus Is a Nutter", reached number 14 in the UK charts, and the second single, "R'n'B", got to number 26. The phrase "Safe as fuck" is one of the band's catchphrases, along with "You knows it".

Track listing
HIDDEN TRACK "Bedsit"
 "Intro" - 0:10
 "Your Missus Is a Nutter" - 4:05
 "Bad Boy Limp" - 3:22
 "Charmschool" - 3:12
 "R'n'B" - 3:23
 "HRT" - 3:36
 "Dog" - 0:34
 "Maggot at Midnight" - 3:31
 "Hit Song" - 3:55
 "Monkey Love" - 3:31
 "Short Term" - 3:35
 "Paranoia" - 3:49
 "Sister" - 3:20

References 

2005 albums
Goldie Lookin Chain albums